Apodothina is a genus of fungi within the class Sordariomycetes. This is a monotypic genus, containing the single species Apodothina pringlei.

External links
Index Fungorum

Phyllachorales
Monotypic Sordariomycetes genera
Taxa named by Franz Petrak
Taxa described in 1970